is a snowball fighting-competition from Japan. Today there are annual tournaments in Sōbetsu, Hokkaidō in Japan, Kemijärvi in Finland, Vardø in Norway, Murmansk in Russia, Mount Buller, Victoria in Australia, Luleå in Sweden, Anchorage in Alaska, Aparan in Armenia, Jasper, Alberta and Saskatoon, Saskatchewan in Canada.

The word consists of the Japanese words yuki (snow) and kassen (battle) with rendaku. Hence yukigassen means snow battle, but is a common term for 'snowball fight' in Japanese.

Gameplay
Yukigassen is a game between two teams with seven players each. The game is played on a court with certain measurements, and the winner is determined through rules made by the Japan Yukigassen Federation.  It is similar to capture the flag; players are eliminated when hit with snowballs.  Players wear special yukigassen helmets with face shields, and a set number of snowballs (90) are made in advance.

Tournaments
 World Championship in Sōbetsu, Hokkaidō, Japan
 European Championship in Kemijärvi, Finland
 Swedish Championship in Luleå, Norrbotten, Sweden (Luleå University of Technology)
 Nordic Championship in Vardø, Finnmark, Norway
 Australian Championship in Mount Baw Baw, Australia from 2019
 Anchorage, Alaska, United States
 Jasper, Alberta, Canada
 Russian Championship in Murmansk, Russia
 Champions League of Yukigassen in Aparan, Armenia

Medal winners (until 2017)

2017 
Here is a list of medal winners in the Swedish championship, held in Luleå in 2017

Gold Medal: Team Minttu

Silver medal: unknown

Bronze medal: unknown

2013 
Here is a list of medal winners in the Canadian National championship, held in Jasper, Alberta, in 2013

Gold Medal: unknown

Silver medal: unknown

Bronze medal: Team Goliath Snubbing

2012 
Here is a list of medal winners in the third Swedish championship, held in Luleå in 2012

 Gold Medal: I & Co
 Silver medal: KREwasion Invasion
 Bronze medal: Team LTU/Backyard Porsön

2011 
Here is a list of medal winners in the second Swedish championship, held in Luleå in 2011

Gold Medal: Backyard Porsön

Silver medal: Cockroaches

Bronze medal: I & Co

2010 
Here is a list of medal winners in the first Swedish Championship, held in Luleå in 2010

Gold Medal: Team LTU/Backyard Porsön

Silver medal: I & Co

Bronze medal: Gefle Snow Warriors

2007
Here is a list of the medal winners in the European Nordic Tournament in Vardø in 2007

Gold Medal: Hiawatha (Norwegian)

Silver medal: IL Tempo Gigante (Norwegian)

Bronze medal: KP 55 (Finnish)

2006
Here is a list of the medal winners in the Nordic Tournament in Vardø in 2006:

Gold: Lapin Peurat (Finnish)

Silver: KP 55 (Finnish)

Bronze: Små Rasmus etterkommere (Norwegian)

2005
Here is a list of the medal winners in the Nordic Tournament in Vardø in 2005:

Gold: Små Rasmus etterkommere (Norwegian)

Silver: Hiawatha (Norwegian)

Bronze: KP 55 (Finnish)

See also
Snowball fight

References

External links
Showa-Shinzan International Yukigassen (Japan)
Yukigassen Nordic Championship (Norway)
Swedish Yukigassen Official Association
Yukigassen Canadian Championship

Japanese games
Ball games
Snow
Articles containing video clips